Volume Up is the third extended play by South Korean girl group 4Minute. It was released by Cube Entertainment and distributed by Universal Music on April 9, 2012.

Release 
4Minute originally scheduled their EP release for February 2012; however, this date was subsequently delayed several times. Volume Up was finally released and officially revealed on April 9, 2012. The premiere of the music video for the title song took place on the same day.

Promotion 
The group promoted the title track "Volume Up" (as well as the track "Dream Racer") on several music shows. Between April 12 and 15, 2012, they appeared onstage at music shows, including Mnet's M! Countdown, KBS's Music Bank, MBC's Show! Music Core and SBS's Inkigayo.

Music video 
The set from the music video for "Volume Up" reportedly cost $132,538, making it the ninth most expensive K-pop music video. This video features a gothic set reminiscent of a Dark-Age castle. It consists of several tightly-edited shots of the group, sometimes with dancers and sometimes with animals in the background, combined with shots of the ominous-looking interior architecture. This music video was released on April 9, 2012.

Commercial performance 
Volume Up debuted at number 7 on the Gaon Album Chart for the week ending April 14, 2012. In its third week, the EP peaked at number 1. It was the fourth best-selling album in April 2012 with 42,060 copies sold. The album sold 56,174 copies in 2012.

Track listing

Charts

Release history

References

External links 

4Minute EPs
Cube Entertainment EPs
2012 EPs
Korean-language EPs